Thiago de Morais de Souza (born 7 January 1999), sometimes known as Thiaguinho or just Thiago, is a Brazilian footballer who currently plays for Retrô Brasil, on loan from Athletico Paranaense.

Club career
Thiago de Souza began his youth career at Athletico Paranaense in 2014. He was loaned to USL League One team Orlando City B in the United States for the 2019 season. He finished as the team's leading goalscorer with six goals. In January 2020, he was loaned to Retrô Brasil for the duration of the Campeonato Pernambucano.

References

External links 
 

1999 births
Living people
Brazilian footballers
Brazilian expatriate sportspeople in the United States
Association football midfielders
Expatriate soccer players in the United States
Club Athletico Paranaense players
Orlando City B players
Retrô Futebol Clube Brasil players
USL League One players